

Championships

World Championship
None*

Professional
Men
1993 NBA Finals:  Chicago Bulls over the Phoenix Suns 4-2.
 1993 NBA Playoffs
1992-93 NBA season
1993 NBA draft
1993 NBA All-Star Game
Eurobasket:  Germany
Women
Eurobasket Women:  Spain def. France

College
Men
NCAA
Division I:  North Carolina 77, Michigan 71
NIT:  University of Minnesota def. Georgetown University
Division II:  California State University-Bakersfield 85, Troy State University 72
Division III: Ohio Northern University 71, Augustana College (Illinois)  68
NAIA
Division I Hawaii Pacific University 88, Oklahoma Baptist University 83
Division II Willamette University OR 63, Northern State University SD 56
NJCAA
Division I Pensacola Junior College 79, Butler Community College - Kansas 74
Division II Owens Technical College, OH 109, Northeastern Christian Junior College PA 85
Division III Onondaga Community College 84, Minneapolis CC MN 78
Women
NCAA
Division I:  Texas Tech University 84, Ohio State University 74
Division II: North Dakota State 95, Delta State University 63
Division III: Central College Iowa 71, Capital 63
NAIA
Division I: Arkansas Tech University 76, Union University TN 75
Division II: Montana State University - Northern 71, Northern State University (SD) 68
NJCAA
Division I Kilgore College 104, Louisburg College 99
Division II Illinois Central College 76, Kankakee Community College 71 OT
Division III Hudson Valley Community College 51,	Quinsigamond Community College 50

Awards and honors

Professional
Men
NBA Most Valuable Player Award:   Charles Barkley, Phoenix Suns
NBA Rookie of the Year Award:  Shaquille O'Neal, Orlando Magic
NBA Defensive Player of the Year Award:  Hakeem Olajuwon, Houston Rockets
NBA Coach of the Year Award: Pat Riley, New York Knicks

Collegiate 
 Men
John R. Wooden Award: Calbert Cheaney, Indiana
Naismith College Coach of the Year: Dean Smith, North Carolina
Frances Pomeroy Naismith Award: Sam Crawford, New Mexico State
Associated Press College Basketball Player of the Year: Calbert Cheaney, Indiana
NCAA basketball tournament Most Outstanding Player: Corliss Williamson, Arkansas
USBWA National Freshman of the Year: Jason Kidd, California
Associated Press College Basketball Coach of the Year: Eddie Fogler, Vanderbilt
Naismith Outstanding Contribution to Basketball: Dave Gavitt
 Women
Naismith College Player of the Year: Sheryl Swoopes, Texas Tech
Naismith College Coach of the Year: C. Vivian Stringer, Iowa
Wade Trophy: Karen Jennings, Nebraska
Frances Pomeroy Naismith Award: Dena Evans, Virginia
NCAA basketball tournament Most Outstanding Player: Sheryl Swoopes, Texas Tech
Carol Eckman Award: C. Vivian Stringer, Iowa

Naismith Memorial Basketball Hall of Fame
Class of 1993:
Walt Bellamy
Julius Erving
Dan Issel
Dick McGuire
Ann Meyers
Calvin Murphy
Uļjana Semjonova
Bill Walton

Births
 March 7
Özge Kavurmacıoğlu, Turkish basketball player
Stefan Popovski-Turanjanin, Serbian basketball player
 May 11 – Maurice Harkless, American-Puerto Rican basketball player

Deaths
 January 3 — Johnny Most, Famed announcer for the Boston Celtics (born 1923)
 January 15 — Henry Iba, Hall of Fame college coach and two-time national champion (Oklahoma A&M) and three-time Olympic coach (born 1904)
 January 18 — Paul Hansen, 64, American college coach (Oklahoma City, Oklahoma State).
 January 19 — Chris Street, Iowa Hawkeyes forward (born 1972)
 January 22 — Jim Pollard, Hall of Fame player for the Minneapolis Lakers (born 1922)
 March 8 — Don Barksdale, College basketball's first African-American consensus All-American (UCLA) (born 1923)
 March 9 — Vanya Voynova, Bulgarian women's player and FIBA Hall of Fame member (born 1934)
 April 11 — Malcolm Wiseman, Canadian Olympic silver medalist (1936) (born 1913)
 April 28 — Jim Valvano, Coach of the 1983 National Champion NC State Wolfpack (born 1946)
 June 3 — Joe Fortenberry, member of 1936 US Olympic champion team (born 1911)
 June 7 — Mike Bloom, All-American college player (Temple), ABL, BAA player (born 1915)
 June 7 — Dražen Petrović, Croatian basketball star of the New Jersey Nets (born 1964)
 June 16 — Arad McCutchan, Hall of Fame coach of the five-time NCAA College Division national champion Evansville Purple Aces (born 1912)
 July 27 — Reggie Lewis, NBA All-Star from the Boston Celtics (born 1965)
 October 17 — Bill Reigel, AAU player and college coach (McNeese State) (born 1932)
 October 21 — Irv Torgoff, College All-American (Long Island), NBL, BAA player (born 1917)
 October 26 — Everett Dean, Hall of Fame coach of the 1942 NCAA Champion Stanford Indians (born 1898)
 November 26 — Tom Scott, American college coach (North Carolina, Davidson) (born 1908)
 November 28 — Robert Hawkins, NBA player (born 1954)
 December 9 — Matt Guokas, Sr., American player (Philadelphia Warriors) and announcer (born 1915)
 December 30 — George Stone, American ABA player (Utah Stars, Carolina Cougars) (born 1946)

References